Patti Austin is the fifth studio album by American R&B singer Patti Austin, released on March 5, 1984 by Qwest Records.

Track listing
Side one
"It's Gonna Be Special" (Clif Magness, Glen Ballard) – 4:17
"Rhythm of the Street" (Jeffrey Cohen, Preston Glass, Narada Michael Walden) – 4:00
"All Behind Us Now" (David Pack) – 4:59
"Hot! In the Flames of Love" (Cohen, Glass, Walden) – 3:59
"Change Your Attitude" (Magness, Ballard) – 3:41

Side two
"Shoot The Moon" (Ballard, Magness) – 3:35
"I've Got My Heart Set on You" (David Bryant, Diane Warren) – 4:12
"Fine Fine Fella (Got to Have You)" (Ollie E. Brown, Attala Zane Giles, Phillip Ingram) – 4:34
"Starstruck" (Glass, Dwayne Simmons, Walden) – 4:28
"Any Way You Can" (Pack, Michael McDonald) – 4:31

Personnel
Credits are adapted from the Patti Austin liner notes.

 PattI Austin – lead vocals, backing vocals (1, 3, 5, 6)
 John Van Tongeren – keyboards (1, 6), synthesizers (1), additional keyboards (5), sequencing (6), bass (6)
 Preston Glass – acoustic piano (2, 4), backing vocals (2, 4, 9)
 David Sancious – keyboards (2, 4, 9), synthesizers (2, 4, 9)
 Greg Phillinganes – keyboards (3), keyboard arrangements (3)
 David Pack – synthesizers (3), guitar (3), keyboard arrangements (3), rhythm arrangements (3), synth solo (10)
 Tommy Faragher – keyboards (5), sequencing (5), bass (5)
 John Barnes – keyboards (7), synthesizers (7)
 Rex Salas – acoustic piano (8), synthesizers (8)
 Victor Feldman – grand piano (10), Fender Rhodes (10), piano arrangements (10)
 Michael McDonald – Fender Rhodes (10)
 Clif Magness – guitar (1, 5, 6), rhythm arrangements (1), arrangements (5, 6), percussion (6)
 Corrado Rustici – guitar (2, 4, 9)
 Paul Jackson Jr. – guitar (5)
 Tommy Organ – lead guitar solo (5)
 Zane Giles – backing vocals (7, 8), guitar (8), BGV arrangements (8)
 Josef Parson – guitar (8)
 Randy Jackson – bass (2, 4, 9), Pro One bass (2), Simmons drums (2)
 Nathan East – bass (3)
 Cornelius Mims – bass (7, 8)
 Chuck Domanico – bass (10)
 Narada Michael Walden – drums (2, 4, 9), percussion (4), OB-Xa bass (9), Simmons drums (9)
 John Robinson – drums (3, 10)
 Ollie E. Brown – drums (7, 8), percussion (7, 8), Simmons drums (7), rhythm arrangements (7, 8), BGV arrangements (7, 8), special effects (8), synthesizer arrangements (8)
 Frank Martin – DMX sequencing (9)
 Paulinho da Costa – percussion (1, 3)
 Armando Peraza – cuica (2)
 Raul Rekow – congas (2)
 Orestes Vilato – cowbell (2), timbales (2)
 Steve Forman – percussion (6)
 Kim Hutchcroft – tenor saxophone (1)
 Larry Williams – alto saxophone (1), synthesizers (8)
 Ernie Watts – tenor saxophone (3)
 Marc Russo – horns (4), sax solo (4)
 Bill Reichenbach Jr. – trombone (7)
 Gary Grant – trumpet (1, 7)
 Jerry Hey – trumpet (1, 7), horn arrangements (1, 3, 7), additional keyboard arrangements (5), synthesizer arrangements (8), flugelhorn (10)
 Glen Ballard – rhythm arrangements (1), arrangements (5, 6)
 Marty Paich – string arrangements and conductor (3, 10)
 Angela Bofill – backing vocals (2, 4, 9)
 Jim Gilstrap – backing vocals (2, 4, 9)
 Myrna Matthews – backing vocals (2, 4, 9)
 Sheree Brown – backing vocals (7, 8)
 Phillip Ingram – backing vocals (7, 8), BGV arrangements (7, 8)
 Josie James – backing vocals (7)
 Kevin T. Jones – backing vocals (7)
 Paulette McWilliams – backing vocals (7, 8)
 Siedah Garrett – backing vocals (8)

Production
 Executive Producers – Quincy Jones and Ed Eckstine
 Producers – Quincy Jones (Track 1); Narada Michael Walden (Tracks 2, 4 & 9); David Pack (Tracks 3 & 10); Clif Magness (Track 5); Glen Ballard (Tracks 5 & 6); Ollie E. Brown (Tracks 7 & 8).
 Engineers – Tommy Vicari (Track 1); David Frazer (Tracks 2, 4 & 9); Tom Perry (Track 3); Michael Verdick (Tracks 3 & 10); Ian Eales (Tracks 5 & 6); Steve Halquist (Tracks 7 & 8); Al Schmitt (Track 10).
 Assistant Engineers – Mitch Gibson (Tracks 1, 5 & 6); Barbara Rooney (Track 1); John Nowland (Tracks 2, 4 & 9); Paul Erickson (Tracks 5 & 6); Mike Ross (Tracks 5 & 6); David Marquette (Track 6).
 Mixing – Tommy Vicari (Track 1); Michael Verdick (Tracks 3 & 10); Ian Eales (Tracks 5 & 6); Ollie E. Brown and Steve Halquist (Tracks 7 & 8).
 Recorded and Mixed at Ameraycan Studios, Hollywood Sound Recorders, Soundcastle, Weddington Studios and Sunset Sound (Hollywood, CA); The Complex (Los Angeles, CA); The Automatt (San Francisco, CA); Channel Recording (Burbank, CA).
 Strings on Tracks 3 & 10 recorded at Ocean Way Recording (Los Angeles, CA).
 Editing – Ian Eales, Ed Eckstine and Clif Magness.
 Additional Technical Supervision – Ed Eckstine
 Originally mastered by Steve Hall at Future Disc (North Hollywood, CA).
 Remastered by Greg Calbi at Sterling Sound (New York, NY).
 Design – Jeri McManus and Mark Larsen
 Hand Tinting – Dennis Keeley
 Photography – Gary Heery

References

External links

1984 albums
Patti Austin albums
Albums arranged by Marty Paich
Albums produced by Glen Ballard
Albums produced by Quincy Jones
Albums produced by Narada Michael Walden
Qwest Records albums
Dance-rock albums